An Interoperable Object Reference (IOR) is a CORBA or RMI-IIOP reference that uniquely identifies an object on a remote CORBA server.

IORs can be transmitted in binary over TCP/IP via the General Inter-ORB Protocol (the encoding may be big-endian or little-endian), or serialized into a string of hexadecimal digits (prefixed by the string IOR:) to facilitate transport by non-CORBA mechanisms such as HTTP, FTP, and e-mail.

The internal structure of an IOR may contain multiple components. Each component is identified by its integer code and has its own binary format. The codes are assigned by the Object Management Group. The typical IOR normally contains the IP address of the remote host, the number of the remote port on that the CORBA server is listening, a string defining the class of the remote object on which the methods will be invoked, and the object key that is used by the server ORB to identify the object. 

It is possible to register special objects (IOR interceptors) that can add the needed specific components to the IOR being created by the particular ORB.

Common Object Request Broker Architecture